Dick Barton: Special Agent (released in the USA as Dick Barton, Detective) is a 1948 British spy film about special agent Dick Barton adapted from the hugely popular radio drama of the same name produced and directed by Raymond Raikes. It was the first of three films that Hammer Film Productions made about the British agent, followed by Dick Barton at Bay and Dick Barton Strikes Back.

Plot
Dick Barton (Don Stannard) and his colleagues Snowy and Jock are investigating smuggling when attempts are made on his life. It turns out there is a neo-Nazi plot to contaminate Great Britain's water supply.

Cast
 Don Stannard as Dick Barton
 George Ford as Snowy
 Jack Shaw as Jock
 Gillian Maude as Jean
 Beatrice Kane as Mrs Horrock
 Ivor Danvers as Snub
 Geoffrey Wincott as Dr Caspar
 Arthur Bush as Schuler
 Alec Ross as Tony

Release
Though critically unpopular, the film's commercial success prompted Hammer to make a number of movies based on radio and/or TV shows. It was released in the USA as Dick Barton, Detective.

Critical reception
Sky Cinema noted "schoolboy shenanigans from slick Dick and his (badly miscast) aides Jock and Snowy. More laugh-a-minute than thrill-a-minute, this was British 'B'-film making at its grimmest". DVD Talk wrote "the picture has an Ed Wood-like ineptitude", while Allmovie blamed "too much comic relief and terrible pacing".

References

External links
 

1948 films
1940s spy films
British spy films
Films directed by Alfred J. Goulding
Films based on radio series
Hammer Film Productions films
British black-and-white films
1940s British films